Prednisolamate, also known as prednisolone 21-diethylaminoacetate, is a synthetic corticosteroid. It is or was a component of Etaproctene, which contains lidocaine, prednisolamate hydrochloride, and tetryzoline.

References

Corticosteroid esters
Corticosteroids
Glucocorticoids
Mineralocorticoids
Diethylamino compounds